Stop the Bleeding is the seventh studio album by the alternative rock band Sponge. It was released in 2013 on Three One Three Records. This album features five songs previously released on Sponge's 2010  EP Destroy the Boy. These five songs are "Dare to Breathe", "Destroy the Boy", "Come In from the Rain", "Star", and "Before the End", however these songs appear in a different order than they did on Destroy the Boy. Also on this album, Sponge does a rendition of the classic Jim Croce song "Time in a Bottle", along with other new tracks.  The album was originally only sold at the Summerland Tour music festival, but then had a national release on September 17, 2013 and now can be found everywhere.

Release

Sponge announced that they would be joining Everclear, Live, and Filter on the 2013 Summerland Tour. The Summerland Tour was put together by Art Alexakis of Everclear and mainly featured alternative rock bands that started in the 1990s. The tour was originally created in 2012 and had such a positive reception that it was continued in 2013. This tour was originally the only place that you could buy Stop the Bleeding, until Sponge later announced on their website that they had signed with The End Records and would release Stop the Bleeding nationally. The album was released nationally on September 13, 2013. The release of Stop the Bleeding on The End Records has a different track running order and includes a bonus track called "Alcohol and Speed".

Track listing (Three One Three Records)

Track listing (The End Records)

Personnel
 Vinnie Dombroski - vocals
 Billy Adams - drums
 Tim Patalan - bass
 Kyle Neely - guitar/back-up vocals
 Andy Patalan - guitar/back-up vocals

Additional musicians
Steve Roberts
Randy Jacobs
Peter Searcy
Matt Kable
Nick Urbanik
Anamaria Ylizaliturri

Additional personnel
Chris Betea - Photography
Mike Rand - Booking
dadmgraphics.com - Artwork and Layout

Gear
In Tune Picks
Ernie Ball Strings
GHS Strings
Rebel Amplification

References

2013 albums
Sponge (band) albums